Patrick Aaltonen (born March 18, 1994), simply known as Pate, is a Finnish-Thai professional footballer who plays as a full back.

Personal life
Aaltonen was born in Raisio. His father is Finnish and his mother is Thai.

Club career
Patrick Aaltonen began his career in 2011 playing for FC Honka in Finland. Ubon UMT United bought him in 2015. At the 2015 season he played well and the club promoted to the Thai Division 1 League. Fall 2016 Aaltonen returned to FC Honka in Kakkonen.

Honours

Club
FC Honka
 Finnish Cup: 2012

Ubon UMT United
 Regional League Division 2: 2015

References

External links
 
 

1994 births
Living people
People from Raisio
Finnish people of Thai descent
Patrick Aaltonen
Finnish footballers
Association football fullbacks
Pallohonka players
HIFK Fotboll players
FC Honka players
Patrick Aaltonen
IF Gnistan players
Patrick Aaltonen
Ykkönen players
Kakkonen players
Veikkausliiga players
Patrick Aaltonen
Finnish expatriate footballers
Finnish expatriate sportspeople in Thailand
Expatriate footballers in Thailand
Finland youth international footballers
Thai expatriate sportspeople in Finland
Finland under-21 international footballers
Sportspeople from Southwest Finland